Paindivision is an Australian heavy metal band, formed in late 2005 by guitarist Stu Marshall while he was concurrently a member of the Sydney band Dungeon. Paindivision has released two albums and toured extensively in Australia and Japan. The band has opened for a range of touring acts as well, including Armored Saint, Death Angel, Black Label Society, Helloween and Vanishing Point. The band's current members include bassist Dan Quinlan, drummer Frog, and guitarist Ben Thomas.

History

Stu Marshall formed Paindivision (first known as 20 Grams) as a side-project to Dungeon in 2005, 
originally with Tim Yatras (also from Dungeon) on drums, Jason Spendir on bass, Ray Martens on keyboard and Mark Probin as lead vocalist. 
Tim Yatras left after a short time and was replaced by Joe Rahme, and after a few shows around Australia with this line-up, they opened for ex-Skid Row lead vocalist Sebastian Bach, 
Mark Probin was replaced with Jordan Howe, best known from The Harlots, an offshoot of Sydney glam metal act Candy Harlots. 
With this line-up, the group supported Black Label Society in Sydney before reverting to the Paindivision name in November 2006. A self-funded four-track EP titled "Four Play" was also issued, and the band began to develop a profile in Japan, where Marshall was known for his work in Dungeon.

Dan Quinlan replaced Spendir in 2007, and Paindivision began work on a full-length album and tied up a record deal with Riot! Entertainment. The Paindivision album came out in the middle of the year and was supported by a Japanese tour and Australian performances with Sebastian Bach. In February 2008, Paindivision opened for Helloween in Sydney and soon began work on a second album. Before it was completed, Ray Martens departed from the band. He was not immediately replaced, and One Path was recorded as a four-piece with some live tracks included from their Japanese shows. The album was subsequently released in Australia in October of 2008 and by Soundholic in Japan in February 2009. In the meantime, Mark Hobson from Sydney's metal band This World joined Paindivision on guitar, and Pete Hunt of Razor of Occam replaced Rahme. Vocalist Jordan Howe then left the band a day before they were due to play in Sydney with Death Angel and Armored Saint; a temporary replacement performed with Paindivision that day. Since then, Quinlan has been the group's singer.

Hobson parted ways with Paindivision in August 2009 and was replaced by Ben Thomas from Sydney power metal band Thundasteel, who also played on the self-titled album of Marshall's solo project Empires of Eden.

The band is currently recording their 3rd album with the working title of "Warwolf"

Current band members
Dan Quinlan (Bass / lead vocals)
Stu Marshall (guitar & backing vocals)
Frog (drums)
Ben Thomas (Guitar)

Discography
 4 Play EP (2006)
 Paindivision (2007)
 Pain Across Japan Tour EP (2007)
 One Path (2008)

Australian heavy metal musical groups
Musical quartets